Ablah is a village located in the Zahlé District of the Beqaa Governorate in Lebanon.

History
In 1838, Eli Smith noted Ablah's population being Catholics.

References

Bibliography

 

Populated places in Zahlé District